St. John's Lutheran Church is a congregation of the Lutheran Church–Missouri Synod located in Conover, North Carolina, and a member of the LCMS' Southeastern District. Officially formed in 1798, the church has a rich German history.

History 
The first evidence of a congregation on the current site is 1765, but the official land grant was bestowed upon the congregation in 1798.  The founders of the church were largely Pennsylvania Germans (deutsch). The early records of the church have been lost partly as the result of two fires—the first in 1950, the second in 2001. However, in both fires, the church's bell tower, which boasts a distinct blue neon sign in the shape of a cross, has remained intact. The church buildings have, at different times, been used by the Reformed Church in America and various Lutheran synods. The members of St. John's were instrumental in the founding of two Lutheran colleges—the early but now non-existent Concordia College of Conover and Lenoir-Rhyne College (now Lenoir-Rhyne University).

Building 
The current sanctuary was dedicated in 2003. It houses a pipe organ constructed by Casavant Frères of Saint-Hyacinthe, Quebec.

Further reading

External links
St. John's website
LCMS congregation profile

Churches in Catawba County, North Carolina
Former Reformed Church in America churches
Lutheran churches in North Carolina
Lutheran Church–Missouri Synod churches
German-American culture in North Carolina
Pennsylvania Dutch culture
Former churches in North Carolina
18th-century Lutheran churches in the United States